On 14 March 2013, former Chief Justice of Nepal Khil Raj Regmi was sworn in as the interim Prime Minister of Nepal after the major parties of Nepal agreed to let an Independent politician lead the government and prepare the 2013 Nepalese Constituent Assembly election. It was agreed that Regmi had to hand over the power to the new Government of Nepal which would emerge from the elections slated for 21 June 2013 with the amendment that Regmi would keep heading the government until the actual government would be sworn in. Regmi appointed a technocratic Council of Ministers consisting of retired civil servants.

Ministers

References

Government of Nepal
Cabinet of Nepal
2013 in Nepal
2013 establishments in Nepal
2014 disestablishments in Nepal